Kolbeh Square is a square in eastern central Shiraz, Iran where Abu Nasr Boulevard, Bustan Boulevard and Golestan Square meet. There is an urban bus terminal located in this square.

Transportation

Streets
 Golestan Square
 Bustan Boulevard
 Abu Nasr Boulevard
 Taksirani Street

Buses
 Route 2
 Route 17
 Route 24
 Route 72
 Route 73
 Route 77
 Route 97

Streets in Shiraz